Racing the Tide is the fourth studio album by The Elders, released in 2006.

Track listing 

 "Send a Prayer" – 4:55
 "Bad Irish Boy – 3:47
 "Dear God" – 3:41
 "Cousin Charlie" – 3:29
 "Right with the World" – 3:26
 "Racing the Tide" – 4:00
 "Banshee Cry" – 4:46
 "Gonna Take a Miracle" – 4:01
 "Australia" – 3:45
 "Story of a Fish" – 3:25
 "Five Long Years" – 4:29
 "Ever Be a Nation" – 5:20
 "Saint Brendan Had a Boat" – 5:33

References

The Elders (band) albums
2006 albums